Ronnie Coaches (died 21 November 2013), also known as Ronnie, was a Ghanaian-born musician and a member of the Buk Bak hiplife music group.

Education 
He had his secondary school education in Datus Complex School. He also had technical training at Accra Technical Training Centre (ATTC).

Death 
Ronnie died on 21 November 2013 at Korle Bu Teaching Hospital.

References 

Year of birth missing
2013 deaths
Ghanaian musicians